Frederick "Fred" Gitelman (born February 6, 1965) is a Canadian-American bridge player, developer of bridge software, and a founder of the online bridge platform Bridge Base Online.

Biography
Gitelman has won one world championship, nine North American Bridge Championships, and a gold medal in the 2002 IOC Grand Prix. He was a  runner-up in the 1995 Bermuda Bowl as a member of the Canada open . In 2005 he was named Personality of the Year by the International Bridge Press Association.

Gitelman was born in Toronto, Ontario, Canada. He was a member of the Canadian youth and later open international teams before he moved to Las Vegas, Nevada. He resides there with his wife, Sheri Weinstock, also a well-known bridge player.

He competed for Team Canada at the 1993 Maccabiah Games and 1997 Maccabiah Games in Israel.

He is well known for the educational software he produced through his company Bridge Base Inc. His most recent project is Bridge Base Online (BBO), which he began in 2001, for online bridge play. BBO is one of the most popular bridge-playing sites. He officially retired from Bridge Base Online on July 12, 2019.

Bill Gates selected Gitelman as his personal bridge coach.

Creativity at the table

Gitelman is sometimes recognized for his creativity at the bridge table. In one tournament he discarded an Ace, as a signal to his partner to not lead that suit. His partner led the remaining logical suit which Gitelman, being void, ruffed.

Books
 
 Master Class: lessons from the bridge table (Toronto: Master Point Press, 2005), 207 pp. 
 Duplicate Bridge at Home: deals & scoring from Fred Gitelman's Bridge Base Online, Mark Horton and Gitelman (Master Point, 2008), 264 pp. – "commentary by Mark Horton"

Bridge accomplishments

Awards
ACBL Honorary Member of the Year 2005
IBPA Personality of the Year Award 2005

Wins
World Bridge Championships
Rosenblum (1) 2010
North American Bridge Championships (6)
Spingold (2) 2005, 2010
Reisinger (1) 2001
Open Board-a-Match Teams (1) 1998
Jacoby Open Swiss Teams (1) 2003
IMP Pairs (1) 2006
United States Bridge Championships (1)
Open Team Trials (1) 2005
Canadian Championships (2)
National Team Championships (2) 1994, 1995
Other notable wins:
Buffett Cup (1) 2006
IOC Grand Prix (1) 2002
Forbo-Krommenie Nations Cup (1) 2001
Cavendish Invitational Teams (1) 2001
Cavendish Invitational Pairs (1) 2003

Runners-up
Bermuda Bowl (1) 1995
World Transnational Open Teams (1) 2000
World Junior Teams (1) 1991
North American Bridge Championships (7)
Vanderbilt (1) 2009
Spingold (1) 2000
Reisinger (1) 2006
Open Board-a-Match Teams (1) 2002
Jacoby Open Swiss Teams (1) 2002
Life Master Pairs (1) 1999
Life Master Open Pairs (1) 2003
United States Bridge Championships (2)
Open Team Trials (2) 2006, 2007
Other notable 2nd places:
Forbo-Krommenie Nations Cup (1) 2002

References

External links

 Bridge Kids: Fred Gitleman audio-video interview at YouTube (August 6, 2010)
Interview at Bridgebum 
Interview by Lisa Bryn Rundle of University of Toronto Magazine, Spring 2011
"In the Cards – A Conversation with Fred Gitelman" (audio-video), Ideas Roadshow, 2014 
"Thanks, Fred Gitelman" bridgewinners.com July 14, 2019

1965 births
American contract bridge players
Canadian contract bridge players
Bermuda Bowl players
Living people
Sportspeople from Toronto